Willem Drees Sr.  (5 July 1886 – 14 May 1988) was a Dutch politician of the defunct Social Democratic Workers' Party (SDAP) and later co-founder of the Labour Party (PvdA) and historian who served as Prime Minister of the Netherlands from 7 August 1948 to 22 December 1958.

Drees studied Accounting at the Amsterdam Public Trade School obtaining a Bachelor of Accountancy degree and worked as a bank teller for the Twentsche Bank from July 1903 to July 1906 as a stenographer for Parliament from January 1907 until August 1919. Drees was elected as a Member of the House of Representatives after the election of 1933, taking office on 9 May 1933 serving as a frontbencher and spokesperson for Social Affairs. After Party Leader and Parliamentary leader Willem Albarda was appointed as Minister of Water Management in the Cabinet De Geer II Drees was selected as his successor on 10 August 1939. Shortly after the German Invasion Party Leader Albarda announced he was stepping down and Drees was anonymously selected as his successor as Leader on 14 May 1940. Following the end of World War II Drees was appointment as Deputy Prime Minister and Minister of Social Affairs in the national unity Cabinet Schermerhorn–Drees taking office on 25 June 1945. In February 1946 Drees was one of the co-founders of the Labour Party and became its first Leader. For the election of 1946 Drees served as one of the Lijsttrekkers (top candidates) and following a cabinet formation continued his offices in the Cabinet Beel I. For the election of 1948 Drees served again as one of the Lijsttrekkers and following a successful cabinet formation with the Catholics formed the Cabinet Drees–Van Schaik with Drees becoming Prime Minister of the Netherlands and taking office on 7 August 1948.

The cabinet Drees-Van Schaik fell on 24 January 1951 and after a short cabinet formation was replaced by Cabinet Drees I with Drees continuing as Prime Minister. For the election of 1952 Drees served again as Lijsttrekker and following a successful cabinet formation formed the Cabinet Drees II and continued as Prime Minister for a second term. For the election of 1956 Drees once again served as Lijsttrekker and following another cabinet formation formed the Cabinet Drees III and continued as Prime Minister for a third term. The Cabinet Drees III fell on 11 December 1958 and shortly thereafter Drees announced his retirement and would step down as Leader and wouldn't serve another term as Prime Minister. Drees left office following the installation of the caretaker Cabinet Beel II on 22 December 1958.

Drees retired from active politics at 72 but continued to be active as a valued historian and prolific author and served on several state commissions and councils on behalf of the government. Drees was known for his abilities as a skillful team leader and effective manager. During his premiership, his cabinets were responsible for several major social reforms to social security, welfare, Child benefits and education, overseeing the decolonization of the Dutch East Indies following the Indonesian National Revolution, the fallout of the annexation of former German territory and dealing with several major crises such as the North Sea flood of 1953 and Hofmans-scandal. Drees was granted the honorary title of Minister of State on 22 December 1958 and continued to comment on political affairs as a statesman until his death in May 1988 at the age of 101.

Education and private career
Willem Drees was born in Amsterdam on 5 July 1886. After completing his secondary education in 1903 at the Hogeschool van Amsterdam, he worked until 1906 for the Twentsche Bank in Amsterdam. This was followed by a period as a stenographer with the Municipal Council of Amsterdam and then between 1907 and 1919 with the States General of the Netherlands.

Political involvement

Early career
In 1904 he joined the Social Democratic Workers' Party, which later was absorbed into the Labour Party in 1946. From 1910 to 1931 he was chairman of The Hague branch of the Social Democratic Workers' Party and between 1913 and 1941 a member of the municipal council of The Hague. During that period he was alderman for social affairs from 1919 to 1931 and for finance and public works through to 1933.

For 22 years between 1919 and 1941 Drees also held a seat on the Provincial Council of South Holland and for 19 years between 1927 and 1946 one on the Social Democratic Workers' Party executive. Between 1933 and 1940 he represented the Social Democratic Workers' Party in the House of Representatives and from 1939 as leader in the House of Representatives

During the German occupation Drees was taken hostage in Buchenwald concentration camp on 7 October 1940. After release, he played a prominent role, as vice chairman and acting chairman of the illegal Executive Committee of the SDAP, and as a prominent participant in secret interparty consultations. In 1944, he became chairman of the Contact Commissie van de Illegaliteit and a member of the College van Vertrouwensmannen which the government in exile charged with the preparation of steps to be taken at the time of liberation.

Thereafter, from 24 June 1945 to 7 August 1948 Drees was Minister of Social Affairs and Deputy Prime Minister in the Cabinet Schermerhorn/Drees.

Prime Minister of the Netherlands
From 7 August 1948 to 22 December 1958 he was Prime Minister of the Netherlands in four successive cabinets: First Drees cabinet, Second Drees cabinet, Third Drees cabinet and Fourth Drees cabinet.

Drees's period in office saw at least four major political developments: the traumas of decolonisation, economic reconstruction, the establishment of the Dutch welfare state, and international integration and co-operation, including the formation of Benelux, the OEEC, NATO, the ECSC, and the EEC. When his Cabinet broke up in December 1958, he was appointed to the honorary position of Minister of State, the Labour Party appointed him a member of its Executive Council for life in 1959. Due to impaired hearing he stopped attending its meetings in 1966. He strongly disagreed with New Left tendencies in the membership and strategies of the Labour Party. He eventually gave up membership of a party he had served for close to 67 years.

Drees was an Esperantist and addressed the 1954 World Congress of Esperanto, which was held in Haarlem.

A wide range of social reforms were carried out during Drees's tenure as Prime Minister. The Occupational Pensions Funds Act of March 1949 made membership of industry-wide pension funds compulsory, while the General Old Age Pensions Act of May 1956 introduced universal flat-rate old age pensions for all residents as a right and with no retirement condition at the age of 65. The Retired Persons' Family Allowances Act of November 1950 established a special allowance for pensioned public servants with children, a law of November 1950 extended compulsory health insurance to cover other groups, such as old-age and invalidity pensioners, and a law of December 1956 introduced health insurance with special low contributions for old-aged pensioners below a certain income ceiling. A law of August 1950 established equal rights for illegitimate children, and introduced an allowance for disabled children between the ages of 16 and 20. The Temporary Family Allowances Act for the Self-employed of June 1951 entitled self-employed persons with low incomes to family allowance for the first and second child, and a law of February 1952 introduced an allowance for studying and for disabled children until the age of 27. Safety Regulations for Electric Passenger and Goods Lifts with a Cage that can be entered were introduced on 15 June 1949. A Decree further amending the Safety Decree for Factories and Workplaces, 1938 Dated  January 1950  “ adds seven new Sections, 212-212 F to the Safety Decree of 1938. The new sections deal with construction, repair or demolition of buildings, foundations, water works, underground conduits and roads. In addition to general safety provisions, there are provisions concerning the construction and use of scaffolds, floors, gangways, stairs, gangplanks, etc., and hoisting appliances.” In 1950, works councils were established, and in 1957 the dismissal of female civil servants upon marriage was abolished.

In the field of housing, the Implementation for Rent Act (1950) fixed rents and rent increases, while the Regional and Town Planning Act (1950) regulated the planning of house building. In addition, the Reconstruction Act of 1950 established housebuilding programmes, and legislation was passed on house building standards (1951), the uniformity of buildings (1954), and uniform building standards (1956). In education, measures were carried out such as increased expenditure on the system, a reduction in registration fees at State universities and at the institute of technology, and the granting (in January 1956) of a special benefit to primary school teachers and to certain categories of vocational teachers, "particularly those who risk being unemployed and who cannot lay claim to a retaining fee." Other initiatives included secondary schools for girls and special primary education in 1949, teacher training colleges in 1952, the extension of compulsory education to 8 years in 1950, and the Nursery Education Act of 1955, which introduced the option of kindergarten for children from the age of four upwards, while also establishing regulations for nursery-school teachers. A department of social welfare was also established (1952), while laws were passed on unemployment benefits (1952) and a widows' and orphans' pension (1956).

Personal life
On 28 July 1910, Drees married Catharina Hent (6 May 1888 – 30 January 1974) and had two sons and two daughters,
Both his sons Jan Drees and Willem Drees Jr. were active members of the Labour Party, but left the party around 1970 to join the Democratic Socialists 1970. The cause was a row with younger party members who wanted to plot a more radical left-wing course for the party. Drees himself left the Labour Party in 1971 leaving them without their icon, but he never joined the Democratic Socialists 1970.

Drees was a Teetotaler. Willem Drees died on 14 May 1988 in The Hague, two months before his 102nd birthday. From 22 August 1986, when former Turkish President Celâl Bayar died, until his own death Drees was the world's oldest living former head of government.

In 2004 he ended in third place in the election of The Greatest Dutchman.

Further reading
Four Volume Biography Willem Drees 1886–1988, in Dutch:
 Jelle Gaemers, De rode wethouder: De jaren 1886–1940" (Amsterdam: Balans, 2006).637 pp. .
 Hans Daalder, Gedreven en behoedzaam: De jaren 1940–1948 (Amsterdam: Balans, 2003). 528 pp. .
 Hans Daalder, Vier jaar nachtmerrie: De Indonesische kwestie (Amsterdam: Balans, 2004). 548 pp. .
 Hans Daalder en Jelle Gaemers, Premier en elder statesman: De jaren 1948–1988 (Amsterdam: Balans, 2014). 640 pp. .
 W. Drees, Gespiegeld in de tijd. De nagelaten autobiografie'' (Amsterdam 2000). (Memoir by Willem Drees, Jr.)

Decorations

References

External links

Official
  Dr. W. (Willem) Drees Parlement.com
  Kabinet-Drees-Van Schaik Rijksoverheid
  Kabinet Drees I Rijksoverheid
  Kabinet-Drees II Rijksoverheid
  Kabinet-Drees III Rijksoverheid

1886 births
1988 deaths
Aldermen of The Hague
Dutch anti-poverty advocates
Buchenwald concentration camp survivors
Cold War historians
Deputy Prime Ministers of the Netherlands
Dutch accountants
Dutch agnostics
Dutch autobiographers
Dutch centenarians
Dutch Esperantists
Dutch former Christians
Dutch humanists
Dutch male short story writers
20th-century Dutch short story writers
Dutch members of the Dutch Reformed Church
Dutch memoirists
Dutch people of World War II
Dutch political party founders
Dutch political philosophers
Dutch political writers
Dutch prisoners of war in World War II
Dutch resistance members
Former Calvinist and Reformed Christians
Historians of communism
Historians of World War II
Historians of the Holocaust
Housing reformers
Honorary Knights Grand Cross of the Order of St Michael and St George
Labour Party (Netherlands) politicians
Leaders of the Labour Party (Netherlands)
Leaders of the Social Democratic Workers' Party (Netherlands)
Dutch Marxist historians
Dutch Marxist writers
Members of the House of Representatives (Netherlands)
Members of the Provincial Council of South Holland
Men centenarians
Ministers of Colonial Affairs of the Netherlands
Ministers of Finance of the Netherlands
Ministers of General Affairs of the Netherlands
Ministers of Social Affairs of the Netherlands
Ministers of State (Netherlands)
Municipal councillors of The Hague
Politicians from Amsterdam
Prime Ministers of the Netherlands
Public historians
Recipients of the Medal of Freedom
Social Democratic Workers' Party (Netherlands) politicians
Stenographers
World War II civilian prisoners
World War II prisoners of war held by Germany
Writers about activism and social change
Writers about communism
Writers from The Hague
20th-century Dutch civil servants
20th-century Dutch historians
20th-century Dutch male writers
20th-century Dutch politicians
20th-century memoirists
Recipients of Order of the Holy Trinity (Ethiopia)